The Vindec High Riser was a children's wheelie bicycle of the 1970s, first manufactured in 1972 by the British company Brown Brothers. It was quite similar in design to the Raleigh Chopper.

References

Bicycle models
Cycle types